Loverboy is the debut studio album by Canadian rock band Loverboy. It was released in August 1980.

Critical reception

AllMusic gave the album a rave retrospective review, making particular note of the hybridization of musical styles on most of the songs, and picking out "The Kid Is Hot Tonite" and "Turn Me Loose" as especially strong tracks.

Track listing

Personnel
All information from the album's vinyl sleeve.

Loverboy
 Mike Reno – lead vocals
 Paul Dean – guitar, backing vocals
 Doug Johnson – keyboards
 Scott Smith – bass
 Matt Frenette – drums

Additional musicians
 Wayne Kozak – saxophone
 Nancy Nash – backing vocals on "Turn Me Loose" and "Always On My Mind"

Production
 Bruce Fairbairn – producer
 Bob Rock – engineer
 Mike Fraser – assistant engineer

Charts

Certifications

References

Loverboy albums
1980 debut albums
Albums produced by Bruce Fairbairn
Columbia Records albums
Juno Award for Album of the Year albums